Kinlaw is a surname. Notable people with the surname include:

 Dennis F. Kinlaw (1922–2017), theologian
 Javon Kinlaw (born 1997), American football defensive tackle
 Michael Kinlaw (born 1973), American mortgage broker and politician
 Reggie Kinlaw (born 1957), American football defensive tackle
 Rodney Kinlaw (born 1985), American football running back
 Arthur and Donna Kinlaw, suspects in the murder of Dawn Olanick, previously the unidentified "Princess Doe"

See also
 Kinilaw, a Filipino raw seafood dish